Sparham is a village and civil parish in Norfolk, England. For the purposes of local government, it falls within the Upper Wensum Ward of Breckland District Council and the Elmham and Mattishall Division of Norfolk County Council.

The villages name means 'spar homestead/village' or 'spar hemmed-in land'.

Sparham is one of the highest points in Norfolk, and the top of the church tower has views of the surrounding countryside for several miles.

The hamlet of Sparhamhill lies to its east and south on the main A1067 road.

Notes 

http://kepn.nottingham.ac.uk/map/place/Norfolk/Sparham

See also

, a 

Villages in Norfolk
Civil parishes in Norfolk
Breckland District